3-Methoxy-4-methylamphetamine (MMA) is an entactogen and psychedelic drug of the phenethylamine and amphetamine classes. It was first synthesized in 1970 and was encountered as a street drug in Italy in the same decade. MMA was largely forgotten until being reassayed by David E. Nichols as a non-neurotoxic MDMA analogue in 1991, and has subsequently been sold as a designer drug on the internet since the late 2000s (decade).

In animal studies, MMA fully substitutes for MDMA and MBDB, partially substitutes for LSD, and does not substitute for amphetamine. Additionally, it has been shown to potently inhibit the reuptake of serotonin and does not produce serotonergic neurotoxicity in rodents. These data appear to confer a profile of MMA as a selective serotonin releasing agent (SSRA) and 5-HT2A receptor agonist. According to SwissTargetPrediction, MMA may have an affinity for the 5-HT2A, 5-HT1B, D2, D3 receptor as well as serotonin, norepinephrine and dopamine transporters.

At high doses, such as 120 mg, the effects are psychedelic (comparable to DOM).

See also 
 3-Methoxyamphetamine (3-MeOA)
 3-Methoxymethamphetamine (MMMA)
 4-Methylamphetamine (4-MA)
 4-Methylmethamphetamine (4-MMA)
 4-Methylmethcathinone (4-MMC)
 4-Cl-3-MMC

References 

Substituted amphetamines
Entactogens and empathogens
Phenol ethers
Designer drugs
Serotonin receptor agonists
Serotonin releasing agents
Substances discovered in the 1970s